Allan Johnson (1871–1934) was an Anglican priest.

Alan Johnson (born 1950) is a British Labour Party politician and former Home Secretary.

Allan or Alan Johnson may also refer to:

Alan Bond Johnson (born 1939), United States District Judge, United States District Court for the District of Wyoming
Alan Johnson (choreographer) (1937–2018), film choreographer, best known for his work on Mel Brooks films
Alan Johnson (footballer, born 1947), English football player
Alan Johnson (footballer, born 1971), English football defender
Alan Johnson (Australian footballer) (born 1956), Australian rules footballer who played with Melbourne
Alan Johnson (baseball) (born 1983), pitcher for the Colorado Rockies
Alan Johnson (priest), Archdeacon of Bombay
Alan Johnson (political theorist), British socialist academic
Alan Campbell Johnson (1913–1998), British Liberal Party politician, journalist, and author
Alan Scott Johnson (died 2003), murder victim
Alan Johnson, a fictional character in the British TV series Peep Show played by Paterson Joseph

See also
Alann Johnson, American politician
Allan G. Johnson (1946–2017), American writer
Allan "Al" Johnson (ice hockey)
Allen Johnson (disambiguation)
Alan Johnston (disambiguation)
Al Johnson (disambiguation)